Armin Meyer (born 1907, date of death unknown) was an Argentine rower. He competed in the men's eight event at the 1928 Summer Olympics.

References

1907 births
Year of death missing
Argentine male rowers
Olympic rowers of Argentina
Rowers at the 1928 Summer Olympics
Place of birth missing